José María Coronado García (born 14 August 1957) is a Spanish film and television actor and former model. His performances playing (often corrupt and/or morally dubious) law enforcement officer roles have brought him some of the greatest successes of his career.

Biography 
José María Coronado García was born in Madrid on 14 August 1957, son to a well-off family from Chamberí. He started studies in Medicine and later Law, from which he dropped out, accepting an offer to participate in a commercial shot in Menorca. Before joining the acting school of Cristina Rota, Coronado worked as model, choreographer, also opening a restaurant. Following the acting courses, he landed a small role in the stage play El público, performed in 1987 in Madrid. His debut in a feature film came with a performance in Waka Waka.

He won several awards for his performance as the lead actor in the 2011 film No habrá paz para los malvados, including a Goya, a Sant Jordi Award, and a Fotogramas de Plata award.

He is also known for his romantic life, with affairs such as the Spaniard beauty queen Amparo Munoz,  Isabel Pantoja, Paola Dominguín, Esther Cañadas and Mónica Molina.

Filmography

Film

Television

Accolades

References

External links

Artículo sobre José Coronado

1957 births
Living people
Spanish male television actors
Spanish male film actors
Male actors from Madrid
20th-century Spanish male actors
21st-century Spanish male actors